Sun Children, also known as The Sun, is a 2020 Iranian drama film co-produced, co-written and directed by Majid Majidi. It was presented in competition at the 77th Venice International Film Festival, where child actor Rouhollah Zamani won the Marcello Mastroianni Award. It was selected as the Iranian entry for the Best International Feature Film at the 93rd Academy Awards, making the shortlist of fifteen films.

Plot 
12-year-old Ali and his three friends do small jobs and petty crimes to survive and support their families. In a timely turn of events, Ali is entrusted to find a hidden underground treasure. However, in order to gain access to the tunnel where the treasure is buried, Ali and his gang have first to enroll at the near Sun School, a charitable institution that tries to educate street kids and child laborers.

Cast 
 Rouhollah Zamani as Ali
 Javad Ezzati as School Vice Principal
 Shamila Shirzad as Zahra
 Ali Nassirian as Hashem
 Abolfazl Shirzad as Abolfazl
 Seyyed Mohammad Mehdi Mousavi Fard as Mamad
 Mani Ghafouri as Reza
 Safar Mohammadi as School Janitor
 Ali Ghabeshi as School Principal
 Tannaz Tabatabaei as Ali's mother (cameo).

Reception

Critical response 

— The Hollywood Reporter / Deborah Young

— Variety / Peter Debruge

— The Guardian / Xan Brooks

Metacritic, assigned the film a weighted average score of 70 out of 100, based on 10 critics, indicating "generally favorable reviews".

Accolades

See also
 List of submissions to the 93rd Academy Awards for Best International Feature Film
 List of Iranian submissions for the Academy Award for Best International Feature Film

References

External links
 
 
 

2020 films
2020 drama films
Iranian drama films
2020s Persian-language films
Films directed by Majid Majidi
Films about child labour
Films set in Tehran
Films whose writer won the Best Screenplay Crystal Simorgh
Crystal Simorgh for Best Film winners